Rathi may refer to:

 Rathi (warrior), ancient Hindu mythological warrior
 Rathi cattle, an Indian breed
 Rathi, sub-class of the Rath tribe, a Maheshwari Bania community of Marwari people
 Rathi Polybond, Indian engineering company
 Nikhil Rathi, chief executive of the UK's Financial Conduct Authority
 Rathi Arumugam (born 1982), Indian actress
 Rathi Menon (born 1990), Singaporean model, Miss Singapore Universe 2014

See also 
 Rati, the Hindu goddess of love, carnal desire, lust, passion and sexual pleasure
 Rati (given name)